Stephanie Thomas is an American disability fashion stylist, creative director, public speaker, voice actor, author, and professor. In 2006 she coined the phrase "Why are there more in-store clothing options for pets than there are for people with disabilities?". In 2019, Thomas made the Business of Fashion BOF 500 list of People Shaping the Global Fashion Industry.

People (magazine) reported that during her time working at WVKL-FM (95.7) radio station in Norfolk, Virginia as part of the "PJ Deejay" campaign, Thomas strictly wore pajamas for an entire year, and discussed the issue on-air everyday to raise awareness of the limited clothing options for people with physical disabilities. Through this experience, Thomas noticed that the stress of going out in public dressed like nobody else was leading her to isolation.

Her work in disability fashion styling, challenging industry ableism spans 30 years, developing and trademarking the Disability Fashion Styling System which has been featured by Vogue, The Guardian, Refinery29, Highsnobiety,  Paper and The New Yorker.

Early life and education
Thomas was born in Chicago, Illinois, she is a congenital amputee missing a right thumb and toes on both of her feet. In her TEDx talk, she revealed that she was not supposed to walk.

Upon graduating high school in 1987 she received a Master of Arts in Fashion Journalism from the Academy of Art University and a Ph.D certificate in Organizational Change and Leadership from Walden University.

Career
In an interview with the Guardian, Thomas shared that in 2006 she noticed how, we have more clothing in stores for dogs than we do for people with disabilities.  According to Thomas, people with disabilities are not acknowledged as fashion customers, despite representing USD $8 trillion of disposable income. Between 1992 and 2003, Thomas conducted research around disability fashion which informed her trademarked Disability Fashion Styling System established in 2004. It suggests that all clothing, accessories and footwear must be "Accessible, Smart and Fashionable".

Stephanie Thomas, has been a professional voice actor and jingle singer since 1997. She describes voice acting as being the fulfillment of a childhood dream. She has voiced over for  Disney, Hilton, Macy’s, Toyota, Martini and Rossi, McDonald’s and Netflix.

Thomas is an adjunct professor at Woodbury University in Burbank, California, where she teaches Fashion Marketing at the School of Business and Communication at the School of Media, Culture & Design.

In 2010 Thomas launched a blog which has since grown into a business around disability fashion. The blog features Cur8tors who are ambassadors of people living with disability from different backgrounds including: models, actors and athletes.

To mark the 75th Anniversary of Disability Employment Awareness Month and Dwarfism Awareness Month in October 2020, Thomas produced and hosted a 2-day online event on "The Power of Personal Style" within the disabled community. Speakers included actress and activist Jameela Jamil, actress and founder of Accessible Hollywood Tatiana Lee, actress Tamara Mena, disability inclusion advocates Dru Presta and Shaholly Ayers.

Thomas is the host of a podcast on disability issues.

Notable work 
Thomas regularly works with 2019 Independent Spirit Awards nominated actress and disability influencer Lauren “Lolo” Spencer who has ALS. Spencer has modeled for Tommy Hilfiger adaptive,<ref>{{cite web |title='Give Me Libertys Lolo Spencer Would Not Have Gone to Fyre Festival |url=https://www.interviewmagazine.com/film/lolo-spencer-give-me-liberty-film-youtube-disability-influencer |website=Interview Magazine |date=3 September 2019}}</ref> and was styled by Thomas for the Give Me Liberty premieres at the Sundance and Cannes Film Festival in 2019.

Thomas co-produced "The Fashion Project", a runway show at the 2015 Special Olympics World Games opened by former First Lady Michelle Obama. The catwalk featured athletes with disabilities and their coaches, coinciding with the 25th anniversary of the Americans with Disabilities Act.

Honors
In 2016, Thomas spoke on "Dressing with Disabilities" at Canada’s third largest TEDx event. In 2018, Thomas was recognized as a Distinguished Alumni Award Recipient by Academy of Art University. In 2019, the Business of Fashion featured Thomas on their BOF 500 list of People Shaping the Global Fashion Industry''.

In 2020, Thomas received an Ed Roberts Award for her work as a disability fashion styling expert, and as Founder and CEO of Cur8able, a business dedicated to the art and science of dressing with disabilities.

See also
Fashion in the United States
Voice acting in the United States

References

Activists from Chicago
African-American activists
American disability rights activists
Living people
American voice actresses
American fashion businesspeople
American fashion designers
Kentucky State University alumni
Academy of Art University alumni
Walden University alumni
Woodbury University faculty
Year of birth missing (living people)
American women fashion designers
American women academics
21st-century American actresses
21st-century African-American women